Fused Together in Revolving Doors is the debut studio album by The Red Chord. The name of the album is a reference to a night club fire that took place in Boston in the 1940s during which the crowd tried to exit through a set of revolving doors. People were trampled on and when the building burned down, bodies were found fused together in the doors, hence the name.

The album was re-issued in 2004 with the demo versions of the songs "Jar Full of Bunny Parts" and "Better Judgment".

Track listing

Personnel
 Guy Kozowyk – vocals
 Mike "Gunface" McKenzie – guitar, backing vocals
 Kevin Rampelberg- guitar
 Adam Wentworth – bass
 Mike Justian – drums

References

2002 debut albums
The Red Chord albums
Metal Blade Records albums
Robotic Empire albums